Quinalow is a rural town and locality in the Toowoomba Region, Queensland, Australia. In the  the locality of Quinalow had a population of 173 people.

Geography 
The town is located on Darling Downs in the north of the locality and on the bank of Myall Creek.

Road infrastructure
The Dalby–Cooyar Road runs along the northern boundary. The Pechey-Maclagan Road runs through from south to north.

History 
The Daly brothers established the first butter-and-cheese factory on the Darling Downs in 1889 at Quinalow. The district was named Quinalow by the Daly brothers who named it after Catholic Bishop James Quinn who encouraged Irish Catholics suffering due to the Great Famine to immigrate and settle in the area. The -alow comes from the Irish word lough meaning a brook or stream.

Quinalow Provisional School opened on 6 May 1901, with the original school building being completed on 26 February 1901 at a cost of 122 pound 17 shillings. On 1 January 1909, it became Quinalow State School. In 1965 the school offered secondary schooling. In 1985 a pre-school was added.

In August 1979 the original school building (built in 1901) was relocated to Daly Street, where it was used as a preschool until the new preschool building was built at the school. The original school building was then opened in March 1984 as Quinalow Library. It underwent a major refurbishment in 2014.

Quinalow was affected by the 2010–2011 Queensland floods. Rising floodwaters isolated the town, surrounding the Quinalow pub. Myall Creek was not thought to have risen as high as it did in the 1981 flood.

In the  the locality of Quinalow had a population of 173 people.

Education 

Quinalow State School is a government primary and secondary (Prep-10) school for boys and girls at 7 Progress Street. In 2018, the school had an enrolment of 78 students with 14 teachers (12 full-time equivalent) and 10 non-teaching staff (6 full-time equivalent).

For secondary education to Year 12, the nearest government secondary schools are Dalby State High School in Dalby to the west and Oakey State High School in Oakey to the south.

Amenities 

The Toowoomba Regional Council operates a public library in Daly Street.

Quinalow Public Hall is on the corner of Daly Street and Pechey Maclagan Road.

References

Further reading

Toowoomba Region
Towns in the Darling Downs
1897 establishments in Australia
Populated places established in 1897
Localities in Queensland